Imane is a unisex given name. Notable people with the given name include:

Imane Khalifeh (1955–1995), Male Lebanese educator and peace activist
Imane Merga (born 1988), Ethiopian long-distance runner
Imane Anys (born 1996), better known as Pokimane, Moroccan-Canadian Twitch streamer, YouTube personality